Jacky Molard (born 1961) is a Breton musician known for performing Breton folk music. He plays violin, fiddle, guitar and bass. He is also a composer and producer. Jacky created the "Innacor" Breton/World music label in 2005 along with Erik Marchand and Bertrand Dupont. He has also worked with musicians outside Brittany such as Foune Diarra.

Discography

Solo 
 Acoustic Quartet (2007)

Jacky Molard Quartet 
 Suites (2012)

Appears on 
 Kerden: Cordes de Bretagne (1998)

References

External links
Innacor

Living people
Breton musicians
1961 births